Mareotis Fossae is a group of fossae (troughs) in the Arcadia quadrangle of Mars, located at 44° north latitude and 75.3° west longitude.  It is about 1,860 km long and was named after an albedo feature at 32N, 96W.

References 

Valleys and canyons on Mars
Arcadia quadrangle